Krishna valley or New Vraja Dhama is the largest eco-friendly farm in Europe having an area of 660 acres. It is situated in Somogyvámos, a village 180 km south-west of Budapest. It was built by ISKCON Hungary.

It was established by Sivarama Swami in 1993. Those who live at Krishna Valley source all their food from their organic farm. They have cattle for dairy products and bees for honey.

The flora and fauna of the Krishna Valley is a special mixture of exotic and native species. Flowers like Frangipáni (Plumeria) which is not native in Hungary is also planted here.

Inhabitants

There are about 200 Krishna believers living in Krishna valley. There is a Radha-Shyamasundara temple on Krishna valley, which is also a major tourist attraction.

See also
New Vrindaban, West Virginia

References

Farms
Hindu communities
Hinduism in Hungary